The Ann Connor Brimer Award for Atlantic Canadian Children's Literature is a $2,000 annual award given to an Atlantic Canadian writer deemed to have made an outstanding contribution to literature for young people.  Starting in 2016, the prize alternates annually between young adult and children's fiction published in the previous two years.  In celebration of the award's 25th anniversary, Gavin Brimer, Ann's son, generously donated two $250 prizes for the running-up books.

The Ann Connor Brimer Award is administered by The Ann Connor Brimer Award Society.  Nomination information can be found on the websites of the Atlantic Book Awards and the Writers' Federation of Nova Scotia.

The award is named for Ann Elisabeth Connor Brimer.  Brimer was a teacher, as well as executive director of the Canadian Learning Materials Centre, a research associate with the Atlantic Institute of Education, a program coordinator in continuing education at Dalhousie University, a founding member of the Nova Scotia Coalition on Arts and Culture, as well as the Atlantic Officer for the Canadian Children's Book Centre.

The award is generously supported by members of the Brimer family along with donations from the general public.  Donations to the Ann Connor Brimer Award can be directed to the Writers' Federation of Nova Scotia (writers.ns.ca)

Winners
1991 - Joyce Barkhouse, Pit Pony
1992 - Kevin Major, Eating Between the Lines
1993 - Budge Wilson, Oliver's War 
1994 - Lesley Choyce, Good Idea Gone Bad 
1995 - Sheree Fitch, Mabel Murple 
1996 - Don Aker, Of Things Not Seen 
1997 - Janet McNaughton, To Dance at the Palais Royale 
1998 - Kevin Major, The House of Wooden Santas
1999 - Janet McNaughton, Make or Break Spring
2000 - David Weale, The True Meaning of Crumbfest
2001 - Janet McNaughton, The Secret Under My Skin
2002 - Francis Wolfe, Where I Live
2003 - Lesley Choyce, Shoulder the Sky
2004 - Don Aker, The First Stone
2005 - Alice Walsh, Pomiuk, Prince of the North
2006 - Kevin Major, Aunt Olga's Christmas Postcards
2007 - Budge Wilson, Friendships
2008 - K. V. Johansen, Nightwalker
2009 - Jill MacLean, The Nine Lives of Travis Keating
2010 - Jill MacLean, The Present Tense of Prinny Murphy
2011 - Valerie Sherrard, The Glory Wind
2012 - Susan White, The Year Mrs. Montague Cried
2013 - Lisa Harrington, Live to Tell
2014 - Jill MacLean, Nix Minus One
2015 - Sharon E. McKay, The End of the Line
2016 - Sharon E. McKay, Prison Boy
2017 - Lesley Choyce, Into the Wasteland
2018 - Charis Cotter, The Painting
2019 - Susan Sinnott, Catching the Light
2020 - Sheree Fitch, Everybody’s Different on EveryBody Street
2021 - Tom Ryan, Keep This to Yourself

References

External links
Atlantic Book Awards Ann Connor Brimer Award

Canadian children's literary awards
Atlantic Book Awards
Awards established in 1991
1991 establishments in Canada